= AWS-3 auction =

2014 US telecomm spectrum auction

The Federal Communications Commission (FCC) completed Auction 97, the auction of Advanced Wireless Services (AWS-3) licenses in the 1695–1710 MHz, 1755–1780 MHz, and 2155–2180 MHz bands, on January 29, 2015. The auction resulted in net bids of $41,329,673,325, with 31 winning bidders receiving 1,611 licenses.
